A passport is a booklet issued by countries to their citizens, permitting the person to travel to other countries. In some cases countries issue travel documents similar to passports to their residents. International organizations also issue travel documents, usually called laissez-passer, to their staff. This article shows images of the various passports currently issued.

Contemporary ordinary passports

Special cases
Passports where the captioned country is shown in italics are issued either by territories with extremely limited recognition of their passports or by states that are neither member states of the United Nations nor United Nations non-member observer states.

However, even though Taiwan maintains official diplomatic relations with only 14 countries, its "Republic of China (Taiwan) Passport" is still accepted as a valid travel document in most countries of the world. Although its passport enjoys (for nationals with rights of abode in Taiwan) visa-free (or visa on arrival access) status in 137 countries, ranking the ordinary Taiwanese passport 29th in the world (tied with Uruguay) according to the Visa Restrictions Index, some countries, such as Argentina, Brazil, the People's Republic of China (PRC), Jamaica and Mauritius, pursuant to their positions on Taiwan's political status, refuse to visé or stamp Taiwan passports, and instead issue visas on a separate travel document or a separate piece of paper to Taiwanese travellers to avoid conveying any kind of recognition to Taiwan as a polity distinct from the People's Republic of China (PRC).

Africa

North America

South America

Asia

Europe

Oceania

International organizations and sovereign subjects of international law

Contemporary diplomatic passports

Types

 Biometric passport
 Internal passport
 International passport
 Machine-readable passport

Special passports
 Camouflage passport
 Fake passport
 Green Book (Tibetan document)
 Hajj passport
 Pet passport

Not granting a right of abode
Certain passports do not, without additional endorsement, confer the right of abode anywhere and have varying international acceptance for travel:
  British National (Overseas) passport - GBN is widely accepted for international travel
  British Subject passport - GBS is widely accepted for international travel
  Sovereign Military Order of Malta passport has very limited travel acceptance
  Tongan Protected Person passport has very limited travel acceptance

Travel documents issued to non-nationals
 1951 Convention Travel Document
 1954 Convention Travel Document
 Certificate of identity
 Interpol passport
 Laissez-passer (issued by the European Union and the United Nations)
 Nansen passport
 Travel document

Common design passport groups

 Andean passport
 CARICOM passport
 CEMAC passport 
 Central America-4 passport
 ECOWAS passport
 Mercosul/Mercosur passport
 European Union passport
 Passports issued by EU candidate states
 Five Nations Passport Group

See also
 Travel document
 Identity document

References

External links

Lists by country